Navy Day is a Chilean national holiday (Spanish: Día de las Glorias Navales, literally Day of Naval Glories) celebrated on May 21 each year. The day was selected to commemorate the Battle of Iquique, which occurred on Wednesday, May 21, 1879 during the War of the Pacific. The day is an official holiday and until 2016 was the traditional day for the Annual Statement of the President of the Republic of Chile, also known as the Mensaje Presidencial or Discurso del 21 de mayo), until it was moved on June 1 in 2017 to avoid major protest actions on that day (the practice returned in 2019).

References

External link

National holidays
Annual events in Chile
Autumn events in Chile